Liang Lizhen (1945–2017), also known as Liang Li-chen was a table tennis player from China.

Table tennis career
From 1961 to 1965 she won five medals in doubles, and team events in the World Table Tennis Championships.

In the 1961 World Table Tennis Championships she won a doubles bronze medal with Han Yuzhen. Two years later she won another bronze at the 1963 World Table Tennis Championships in the Corbillon Cup (women's team event) for China.

Her finest moment came when during the 1965 World Table Tennis Championships she won three medals; a bronze in the mixed doubles with Zhuang Zedong, another bronze in the doubles with Li Henan and a gold medal in the Corbillon Cup with Li Henan, Lin Huiqing and Zheng Minzhi.

References

1945 births
2017 deaths
Chinese female table tennis players
Table tennis players from Guangzhou